Tari Tari is a 2012 Japanese anime television series produced by P.A. Works, written, and directed by Masakazu Hashimoto. The series aired in Japan between July 1 and September 23, 2012 on TV Kanagawa, and was also simulcast by Crunchyroll. The series is licensed in North America by Sentai Filmworks. A manga adaptation illustrated by Tomiyaki Kagisora was serialized in Square Enix's Gangan Joker in 2012.

Plot
The story centers around five Japanese high school students who are too young to be called adults, but who no longer think of themselves as children. Wakana Sakai once took music lessons, but she withdrew from music after losing her mother. Konatsu Miyamoto is a positive-thinking girl who loves singing and spends time after school at the vocal music club. Sawa Okita is a spirited archery club member who dreams of becoming a horse rider. Taichi Tanaka is a chronically late badminton team member who lives with his college student sister. "Wien" just transferred into Wakana's class after 12 years abroad in Austria. Music brings Wakana, Konatsu, Sawa and the others together into an ensemble during their last summer in high school. The story is set in Fujisawa and Kamakura, Kanagawa.

Characters

Main characters

 (Japanese)
Wakana lives with her father and her pet cat, Dora. Despite the fact that she is apparently very good at singing, she refuses to do so to the point of turning down Konatsu's attempt to recruit her into her new choir club. Her mother died when she was in her last year of middle school and hid her sickness from her to allow Wakana to focus on her entrance exams and not worry about her, but then she started living in regret for not being able to properly bid farewell to her daughter. When her father shows Wakana her mother' notes regarding a song she was composing to her, she finally manages to move forward and join the club as a regular member while dedicating herself to finish her mother's song. She is in the same after-school class as Wien. She aims to attend music school after graduation and follow in her mother's footsteps.

 (Japanese)
A short, earnest girl who loves to sing and dance. She was previously affiliated with the choir club until she had a falling out with their supervisor, who did not allow her to sing after she had experienced a bout of stage fright the previous year's recital. After that incident, Konatsu began training herself by performing in the public park. She decides to create her own club so she can keep singing, but when it falls too short on members, she combines it with Taichi's badminton club to form the "Choir and sometimes Badminton Club". After graduation, she goes to college and joins a club there.

 (Japanese)
Sawa is Konatsu's best friend. Apart from being an equestrian with her horse, Sabure, Sawa is also a member of the archery club, and is the first member invited by Konatsu to join the latter's new music club. She wishes to become a professional jockey in the future, which often leads to disagreements with her father, who believes her to be simply playing around. To complicate matters, Sawa learns that there is an upper weight limit for students who wish to join the equestrian school and is therefore unable to move on with her dream, even after her father agrees to support her. She drops out of school before graduation in order to attend an equestrian school abroad. Nonetheless, despite leaving Japan and studying abroad prior to the official graduation ceremony, Sawa is still allowed to graduate from Shirahamazaka High School. She is often seen wearing pink and gray headphones.

 (Japanese)
The sole member of the badminton club, Taichi is a very serious yet insensitive person in matters regarding girls. He hopes to become a pro badminton player someday. Taichi is also good at singing. He is terrible at drawing, having once been encouraged by Konatsu to draw again before she saw Taichi's drawing ability and then told him to never draw again. He develops a crush on Sawa.

 (Japanese)
Wien (German for "Vienna") is a returnee who transfers into Shirahamazaka High School after spending twelve years in Austria. Due to his time away, he is very unfamiliar with Japanese customs, and is seen always consulting books about it, with often humorous results. He is in the same after-school class as Wakana and is obsessed with a super sentai show called "Net Hero Ganbaraigers". He often writes letters to a young and sickly Austrian boy named Jan, who he left his Red Ganbaraiger toy with. However, in the anime, the letters show the name "Yang" instead of "Jan". After graduation, he returns to Austria.

Others

 (Japanese)
Wakana's father.

Wakana's late mother, who died just before Wakana entered high school. She was part of the original choir club alongside Naoko and Shiho. She wrote the Condor Queen's best hit, "Amigo! Amigo!", which is also Konatsu's favorite song.

Responsible for Shirahamazaka High's vocal club, who is put in charge of Konatsu's choir club after its adviser, the principal, is hospitalized following a bicycle accident. She is often harsh towards Konatsu, seeing music as something that should not be treated like a game. She was Mahiru's friend in high school and has not been able to get over her death.

The homeroom teacher of Wakana and the other's class, who is currently on maternity leave after giving birth to a baby girl.

Konatsu's younger brother who is often blackmailed by Konatsu into helping out with her club. He is a member of the student council.

Sawa's mother, who enjoys surfing. Like Sawa, she has a bad habit of patting girls on the butt for encouragement. She was Mahiru and Naoko's underclassman in high school.

Sawa's father, who owns the temple near the school where he lives with his family.

Shirahamazaka High's principal and the adviser of Konatsu's club.

Taichi's older sister who takes care of him. She is a college student.

Media

Manga
A manga adaptation illustrated by Tomiyaki Kagisora was serialized in Square Enix's Gangan Joker magazine between the June 2012 and November 2012 issues. The first tankōbon volume was released on July 21, 2012. The second and last was December 22, 2012.

Anime
The 13-episode anime television series is an original creation by Evergreen, produced by P.A. Works, written, and directed by Masakazu Hashimoto, aired in Japan between July 1 and September 23, 2012 on TV Kanagawa, and was also simulcast on Crunchyroll. Sentai Filmworks have licensed the series in North America.

The series has two main pieces of theme music: one opening theme and two ending themes. The opening theme is "Dreamer" by AiRI. The second ending theme, is sung by Seto and Hayami for episode two, and later joined by Takagaki, Shimazaki, and Hanae for episode six.

There are also several insert songs used throughout the anime. Listed below under order of appearance:
 In episode 1, "Reflectia" (the opening theme from the True Tears anime series) is sung by Shirahamazaka High School Vocal Club, and "Goin' My Way!!" is sung by Seto. 
 In episode 4, "Amigo! Amigo!" is by Condor Queens, and "Hau'oli♪" is by Seto, Hayami, Shimazaki, and NHanae. 
 In episode 10, "Nettō Hero Ganbaraiger" is by Takagaki, Seto, Hayami, Shimazaki, and Hanae (collectively credited as Nishinohashi Hero Shoutenger in that episode) which is known to be 'Shirahamazaka High School Choir'. 
 In episode 13, "Radiant Melody" is by Shirahamazaka High School Choir.

Episode list

Novel
On July 12, 2018, a sequel to the anime series, in the format of a novel, was announced.

The book is titled Tari Tari ~Mebaitari Terashitari Yappari Tokidoki Utattari~ (Tari Tari ~Budding, Shining, and Sometimes Singing~), and is set 10 years after the events of the anime story.

Reception

References

External links
 

2012 anime television series debuts
Anime with original screenplays
Gangan Comics manga
Music in anime and manga
P.A.Works
School life in anime and manga
Sentai Filmworks
Shōnen manga
Television shows set in Kamakura